Douglas ("Doug") Kenneth Wood (born January 30, 1966 in Wingham, Ontario) is a retired male pole vaulter from Canada, who represented his native country in the men's pole vault event at the 1992 Summer Olympics. He failed to reach the final, reaching 5.20 metres in the qualification group.

See also
 Canadian records in track and field

References
 Canadian Olympic Committee
 

1966 births
Living people
Canadian male pole vaulters
Athletes (track and field) at the 1990 Commonwealth Games
Athletes (track and field) at the 1991 Pan American Games
Athletes (track and field) at the 1992 Summer Olympics
Olympic track and field athletes of Canada
Track and field athletes from Ontario
Commonwealth Games competitors for Canada
Pan American Games silver medalists for Canada
Pan American Games medalists in athletics (track and field)
People from Wingham, Ontario
Medalists at the 1991 Pan American Games
20th-century Canadian people
21st-century Canadian people